Aristides (530–468 BC) was an ancient Athenian statesman.  Nicknamed "the Just" (δίκαιος, dikaios), he flourished in the early quarter of Athens' Classical period and is remembered for his generalship in the Persian War.  The ancient historian Herodotus cited him as "the best and most honourable man in Athens", and he received similarly reverent treatment in Plato's Socratic dialogues.

Biography

Aristides was a member of a family of moderate fortune; his father's name was Lysimachus. Of his early life, it is only told that he became a follower of the statesman Cleisthenes. He first came to notice as strategos in command of his native tribe Antiochis at the Battle of Marathon, and it was no doubt in consequence of the distinction which he then achieved that he was elected archon eponymos for the ensuing year (489488). Pursuing a conservative policy to maintain Athens as a land power, he was one of the chief opponents of the naval policy proposed by Themistocles.

According to Plutarch, the rivalry between Aristides and Themistocles began in their youth. The conflict between the two leaders ended in the ostracism of Aristides at a date variously given between 485 and 482. It is said that, on this occasion, an illiterate voter who did not recognise Aristides approached the statesman and requested that he write the name of Aristides on his voting shard to ostracize him. The latter asked if Aristides had wronged him. "No," was the reply, "and I do not even know him, but it irritates me to hear him everywhere called 'the Just'."  Aristides then wrote his own name on the ballot.

Early in 480, Aristides profited by the decree recalling exiles to help in the defence of Athens against Persian invaders, and was elected strategos for the year 480–479. In the Battle of Salamis, he gave loyal support to Themistocles, and crowned the victory by landing Athenian infantry on the island of Psyttaleia and annihilating the Persian garrison stationed there.

In 479, he was re-elected strategos, and given special powers as commander of the Athenian forces at the Battle of Plataea; he is also said to have suppressed a conspiracy among some in the army. He so won the confidence of the Ionian allies that, after revolting from the Spartan admiral Pausanias, they gave him the chief command and left him with absolute discretion in fixing the contributions of the newly formed confederacy, the Delian League. His assessment was universally accepted as equitable, and continued as the basis of taxation for the greater part of the league's duration. He continued to hold a predominant position in Athens. At first he seems to have remained on good terms with Themistocles, whom he is said to have helped in outwitting the Spartans over the rebuilding of the walls of Athens.

He is said by some authorities to have died at Athens, by others on a journey to the Black Sea. The date of his death is given by Nepos as 468. He lived to witness the ostracism of Themistocles, towards whom he always displayed generosity, but he died before the rise of Pericles. His estate seems to have suffered severely from the Persian invasions, for apparently he did not leave enough money to defray the expenses of his burial, and it is known that his descendants even in the 4th century received state pensions.

Authorities

Herodotus is not the only ancient author to evaluate Aristides' life. He is also the subject of one of Plutarch's Parallel Lives, although Plutarch, writing during the Roman Empire, was several centuries removed. Aristides is praised by Socrates in Plato's dialogues Gorgias and Meno as an exceptional instance of good leadership.

In Plato's dialogue Theaetetus, Socrates refers to Aristides, the grandson of the famous Aristides, less positively, bringing him as an example of a student who leaves his care too soon and realizes later that he is a fool.

Memorials and representations
There is a statue of Aristides in Louisburg Square in the American city of Boston.

References

Bibliography 

 Macgregor Morris, Ian (2022). “Aristeides the Just?”, in A. Konecny & N. Sekunda (eds.) The Battle of Plataiai 479 BC (Vienna 2022) 133-49.
 Proietti, Giorgia (2015). "War and Memory: the Battle of Psyttaleia Before Herodotus’ Histories", Bulletin of the Institute of Classical Studies 58 (2015) 43– 54.
 Torello, Giulia  (2008). "The Resurrection of Aristeides, Miltiades, Solon and Perikles in Eupolis’ Demes", Antichthon 42 (2008) 40– 55.
 Tuci, Paolo A. (2018). "Aristide 'imperialista' nell’Athenaion Politeia aristotelica", in C. Bearzot – M. Canevaro – T. Gargiulo – E. Poddighe (eds.), Athenaion Politeiai tra storia, politica e sociologia: Aristotele e Pseudo-Senofonte (Milan 2018) 231–251.
 Zaccarini, Marco (2020). "Aristide il Giusto e l’arche ateniese: la giustizia al potere", Rivista di Filologia e Istruzione Classica 148 (2020) 5–33.

External links 
 Plutarch's Life of Aristides in English Translation
 Plutarch's Life of Aristides in English Translation at the Internet Classics Archive
 Plutarch's Life of Aristides in English Translation at the Perseus Project

530 BC births
468 BC deaths
5th-century BC Athenians
Ancient Athenian generals
5th-century BC Ancient Greek statesmen
Athenians of the Greco-Persian Wars
Battle of Marathon
Battle of Plataea
Battle of Salamis
Eponymous archons
Ostracized Athenians